The Bridgestone Guides are independent guides to Irish food and hospitality sponsored by Bridgestone. Written and edited by John McKenna and his wife Sally, the guides have won André Simon, Glenfiddich and Slow Food awards. Prints include the Bridgestone Irish Food Guide, The Bridgestone 100 Best Restaurants in Ireland 2011 and The Bridgestone 100 Best Places to Stay in Ireland 2010.

References

External links
 Bridgestone Guides Official website
 Book review RTÉ

Restaurant guides